Jenny Scott (born 1970) is an English journalist and economist, currently an advisor to the Governor of the Bank of England.

Early life
Born in Windsor, Berkshire, as a result of her engineer father's career the family travelled through West Africa and Australia. Scott was educated at a convent school, before graduating with a degree in economics from King's College, Cambridge.

Career

Economist
On graduation, Scott joined the Bank of England as an economist, before joining Reuters in 1994. She wrote primarily in her field of expertise on economic affairs, but also spent a year in Amsterdam as a general news correspondent. She then returned to London to write the book The Living Economy.

BBC
After seven years with Reuters, Scott joined BBC News as their economics correspondent, until May 2008. In January 2007, Scott presented five special interviews with key figures from business on HARDtalk, known as HARDtalk Business.

She then began co-presenting The Weekend Business on Radio Five Live, as well as co-presenting the BBC Two political magazine show The Daily Politics, alongside Andrew Neil. She also occasionally presented on BBC News 24, and had a stint covering Wimbledon.

Bank of England
On 16 April 2008, it was announced that Scott had been appointed Director of Communications at the Bank of England, succeeding Peter Rodgers when he retired at the end of June.
On 17 February 2011, the Bank of England issued a press release to say that Scott was going to be on adoption leave for a year. After being replaced as Director of Communications by fellow ex-BBC journalist Nils Blythe, Scott returned to the Bank as an Adviser to the Governor in June 2013.

Personal life
Scott is married to Michael Harlow, Deputy Chief Executive and Deputy Chief Land Registrar at Land Registry.
She has two daughters, Lili Harlow and Lara Harlow.
Her sister, Catherine Scott is married to Andrew McKibbin and they have two sons, Samuel McKibbin and Joseph McKibbin.
Her parents are Anne Scott and Eric Scott.

References

External links 
Jenny Scott biography from The Daily Politics

1970 births
Living people
People from Windsor, Berkshire
Alumni of King's College, Cambridge
English reporters and correspondents
English economists
British women economists
English journalists
English television presenters
BBC newsreaders and journalists
People associated with the Bank of England
British women journalists
British radio presenters
British women radio presenters